Finn Olav Gundelach (23 April 1925 – 13 January 1981) was a Danish diplomat and European Commissioner. He served as vice-president of the European Commission from 6 January 1977 to 6 January 1981.

Gundelach was educated from the University of Aarhus in 1951. From 1955 to 1959 he was the Danish ambassador to the United Nations. In 1959 he was named director of the trade branch of GATT and vice director of the entire GATT in 1965. He left GATT in 1967 in order to become Danish ambassador to the EC.

In 1973 he was named as the first Danish European Commissioner by prime minister Anker Jørgensen. He was commissioner from 6 January 1973 until his death in 1981 from a sudden heart attack.

References

|-

|-

1925 births
1981 deaths
20th-century Danish diplomats
Permanent Representatives of Denmark to the United Nations
Danish European Commissioners
European Commissioners 1977–1981
European Commissioners 1981–1985